Bill Decker in an American college baseball coach, currently serving as head coach of the Harvard Crimson baseball program.  He was named to that position prior to the 2013 season.

Playing career
Decker played baseball and football for Ithaca.  His baseball career ended prematurely due to injury, but Decker served as captain of the football team in his senior season.  Decker was a defensive end for the Bombers football team.

Coaching career
Decker's coaching career began with a single season each at Deerfield Academy and Phillips Exeter Academy in assistant coaching roles.  He then moved to the college level at Wesleyan for a single season before earning his first head coaching position at Minnesota's Macalester.  After one season and an 8–26 record, he moved to Trinity in Hartford, Connecticut.  In his second season, the Bantams reached the ECAC semifinals.  In 1998, Trinity made its first of nine appearances in the NCAA Division III Baseball Championship.  The Bantams reached the College World Series in 2003, 2005, and 2008, winning the national championship in 2008.  In his tenure, the Bantams recorded 529 wins and 231 losses, for a winning percentage of .696, including a 45–1 record in 2008.  Decker earned many coach of the year awards, including the American Baseball Coaches Association National Coach of the Year in 2008.  After the 2012 season and another NCAA Tournament appearance, Decker was hired to replace the deceased Joe Walsh at Harvard.

Head coaching record

Football

Baseball
This table shows Decker's record as a collegiate head baseball coach.

See also
 List of current NCAA Division I baseball coaches

References

Year of birth missing (living people)
Living people
Harvard Crimson baseball coaches
Ithaca Bombers baseball players
Ithaca Bombers football coaches
Ithaca Bombers football players
Macalester Scots baseball coaches
Trinity Bantams baseball coaches
Trinity Bantams football coaches
Wesleyan Cardinals baseball coaches
High school baseball coaches in the United States
High school football coaches in Massachusetts
People from Simsbury, Connecticut